The Weza Forest is also known as the Weza-Ngele Forest and is situated near Harding, KwaZulu-Natal, South Africa. This is a large Mistbelt Forest which has long been exploited for timber. The forest has been fragmented and reduced in size over many decades.

Biodiversity
It is an important site for the endangered Cape parrot (Poicephalus robustus robustus). A species of Dwarf Chameleon lives here which is related to, or conspecific with the black-headed dwarf chameleon. The Critically Endangered pink velvet worm (Opisthopatus roseus) is only known to occur in Weza Forest.

References

Bibliography
 Pooley, E. 1993. The Complete Field Guide to Trees of Natal, Zululand and Transkei,  - .
 Tolley, K. and Burger, M. 2007. Chameleons of Southern Africa. .

External links
 Satellite photo of Weza Forest

Geography of KwaZulu-Natal
Forests of South Africa